= Paradesis =

Scientific classification
- Kingdom: Animalia
- Phylum: Arthropoda
- Class: Insecta
- Order: Diptera
- Family: Tephritidae
- Subfamily: Tephritinae
- Genus: Paradesis; Hancock, 1986

Genus of flies

Paradesis is a genus of tephritid or fruit flies in the family Tephritidae.
